Arrowrock Dam is a concrete arch dam in the western United States, on the Boise River in southwestern Idaho, east of Boise. Opened  in 1915, it is located on the border of Boise and Elmore counties, upstream of the Lucky Peak Dam and reservoir.

The dam was designated as a National Historic Civil Engineering Landmark by the American Society of Civil Engineers in 2016, and is operated by the U.S. Bureau of Reclamation.

Preparations
In 1910, the Reclamation Service began to consider another storage facility farther east on the Boise River. After several surveys, engineers decided upon the Arrowrock site which had previously been the site of a private irrigation venture under the direction of Arthur De Wint Foote yet failed for lack of funding. The Arrowrock site is at the confluence of the main channel and the south fork. That was to be the most ambitious project to date for Reclamation. At , Arrowrock would be the largest concrete arch dam in the world. Prior to construction, considerable preparatory work would need to be completed. The Reclamation Service elected to construct a new rail line on the old wagon road leading north to Idaho City. The railroad would begin at the Barberton mill near the Diversion Dam and extend to through a winding canyon up to Arrowrock. Even before the dam had been approved, Reclamation began work on the rail line. 
	
Some significant problems existed with construction of the railroad. The Barberton Lumber Company owned the road's right-of-way. That meant that the Reclamation Service needed to come to an agreement over ownership of the rail line. In an unprecedented move, the government agreed to lease the track from Barberton but run the actual locomotive. Part of this agreement stipulated that the line would remain a common carrier. That made the Arrowrock & Boise Railroad the first publicly owned line in the nation. The Service hid this fact from President William Howard Taft when it applied for the Arrowrock Dam's approval. Fortunately for Reclamation, Taft failed to recognize the loophole and in June 1910, the entire project went forward. However, when the Oregon Shortline refused to honor the pact between Barberton and Reclamation, the Arrowrock & Boise terminal was reduced to a field just outside the Barber lumberyard. On August 22, 1910, the entire deal was finalized and work began on the line to the Arrowrock site. 	
	
Salt Lake City's Manly Brothers won the contract for grading the Arrowrock & Boise road in May 1911. The government called for force account to lay the track from Barber to the work site. Although the construction was delayed several times by the shortage of railroad ties, workers finished the track in early November. By most accounts, the trip through the canyon was a very long and harrowing event. For the first several months, riders were asked to disembark at the unfinished Gooseneck Bridge while the cars were winched across one at a time.

However, once they arrived, most passengers were surprised by what they found. Not only was the view breathtaking but the "work" camp offered amenities that were unavailable to some residents of the Treasure Valley. Not only was the site fully powered, but also it provided a central heating plant, running water and an efficient sewage system. Along with the Reclamation offices, the Arrowrock camp carried a hospital, mess hall, post office, and hotel. Workers and visitors were offered lodging in the site's hotel, bunkhouses, or cottages. In addition to the outdoor recreational activities, the camp also operated a YMCA, school, and dancehall. At the peak of construction, some 1,400 people had called Arrowrock home, including some 200 families.

To provide power for the site, Reclamation retrofitted The Boise River Diversion Dam with a small powerhouse. Finished in 1912, the plant's three generators produced 1,500 kilowatts of electricity for Arrowrock's camp, sawmills, and giant cement mixers. The German made Allis-Chalmers  turbines, the first in the world to be built with a vertical shaft design. Along with the power lines, government forces hung a two-way phone cable to connect Arrowrock with the outside world. In 1976, the power plant was added to the National Register of Historic Places. After being refurbished by the Bonneville Power Administration in 2002, it is now on ready reserve status and occasionally provides surplus power during times of peak demand. Special care was made to maintain the historic qualities of the powerhouse. The original governors, slate control panels, transformers, overhead crane, and generator housings, although no longer functional, were retained for historic purposes.

Work commencement

Work began on the Arrowrock Dam in early 1912 and moved along at a record-setting pace. As labor was becoming more plentiful with the completion of Deer Flat and the Diversion Dam, wage rates began to decrease. Common laborers were now offered $2.40 and day while skilled workers pulled in anywhere from $3.00 to $4.00. In addition, several deductions were made for room and board. Workers could choose between the dormitory style bunkhouses at $1.25 a month or a private room at $4.00. Seventy-five cents was deducted each day for meals and $1.00 a month went towards hospital costs. The work proved moderately dangerous and accounted for numerous injuries and twelve deaths. However, despite the hazards and reduction in pay, it appears there was a unique level of camaraderie at the Arrowrock site.

The Reclamation Service spared no expense regarding the equipment at Arrowrock Dam. Along with the refurbished 70-ton Atlantic steam shovel from Deer Flat were two versatile 18-ton "dinkey" excavators and several brand new dump cars. The cement mixers produced over 2,000 barrels per day and ran uninterrupted for almost 30 months. Two 12-ton Lidgerwood cableways hovered over the site and moved material and concrete from their loading grounds to the dam site. Scores of horse teams helped carry equipment and gravel from the camp to the various work areas. Additionally, one Buick and seven Ford trucks serviced both crews and visitors and provided an unexpected level of mobility throughout the campsite. In an effort to alleviate some of the discomfort along the Boise & Arrowrock, Reclamation purchased a 60-ton locomotive and several new passenger cars. For almost five years, the train ran faithfully through the canyon, delivering over 89,500 visitors and crewmen.

Dedication
On October 4, 1915, the Arrowrock Dam was finally dedicated. In addition, engineers pioneered the use of dam instrumentation with the placement of ten thermometers embedded deep within the structure's concrete. Along with innovative contraction joints, the Reclamation Service was able to control the temperature of the setting concrete, ensuring the dams strength. It is serviced by 25 outlets some of which are designed to regulate themselves, another first in engineering. Ten outlets were built for an eventual power plant, but they have yet to be used.

Within the first week of operation, an estimated 12,000 visitors braved the canyon ride to see the dam. However, as interest waned, the Arrowrock & Boise Railroad schedule dropped significantly. The campsite, once a bustling hive of activity, was quickly becoming a ghost town. On August 11, 1916, the government decommissioned its very first public carrier.

Later work

From 2001 to 2004, ten aging Ensign valves were removed and replaced with clamshell gates. By 2011, work was completed to permanently plug all five sluice gate outlets.

A 15-MW powerplant was added to Arrowrock Dam in March 2010, and the transmission line to the dam was updated.

See also

 List of dams and reservoirs in Idaho - 4th largest in Idaho
 List of lakes in Idaho
 List of dams and reservoirs

References

External links

U.S. Bureau of Reclamation - Arrowrock Dam
U.S. Bureau of Reclamation - major storage reservoirs in the Boise & Payette River basins - current levels & flows
Historic American Engineering Record (HAER) documentation, filed under Boise River, Twin Springs, Boise County, ID:

Dams in Idaho
Reservoirs in Idaho
Hydroelectric power plants in Idaho
Buildings and structures in Boise County, Idaho
Buildings and structures in Elmore County, Idaho
Historic American Engineering Record in Idaho
Lakes of Boise County, Idaho
Lakes of Elmore County, Idaho
United States Bureau of Reclamation dams
Dams completed in 1915
Energy infrastructure completed in 1912
Dams on the Boise River
Arch dams
Boise Project
1915 establishments in Idaho
Historic Civil Engineering Landmarks